Bekkeberga is a village in Viken, Norway, lying to the northwest of Ask.

Villages in Akershus